So Fresh: The Hits of Summer 2003 Plus the Biggest Hits of 2002 is a compilation of the latest songs that were popular in Australia. It was released on 25 November 2002.

Track listing

CD 1
 Las Ketchup – "The Ketchup Song (Aserejé)" (3:32)
 Holly Valance – "Down Boy" (3:26)
 Enrique Iglesias – "Don't Turn Off the Lights" (3:47)
 Shakaya – "Cinderella" (3:34)
 Killing Heidi – "Outside of Me" (4:00)
 Scooter – "The Logical Song" (3:54)
 Kelly Osbourne – "Papa Don't Preach" (3:25)
 Wyclef Jean featuring Claudette Ortiz – "Two Wrongs" (3:52)
 Good Charlotte – "Lifestyles of the Rich and Famous" (3:11)
 Daniel Bedingfield – "James Dean (I Wanna Know)" (3:41)
 Westlife – "Unbreakable" (4:32)
 Monica – "All Eyez on Me" (4:00)
 Ronan Keating – "I Love It When We Do" (3:51)
 U2 – "Electrical Storm" (William Orbit Mix) (4:39)
 Sugababes – "Round Round" (3:57)
 Toya – "No Matta What (Party All Night)" (3:27)
 Marc Anthony – "I've Got You" (3:49)
 Abs – "What You Got" (3:54)
 Tina Arena – "Symphony of Life" (Metro Mix 7") (4:08)
 Milky – "Just the Way You Are" (3:34)

CD 2
 Elvis vs. JXL – "A Little Less Conversation" (3:33)
 George Michael – "Freeek!" (4:33)
 Darren Hayes – "Insatiable" (5:11)
 Usher – "U Got It Bad" (4:08)
 Nikki Webster – "Something More Beautiful" (3:31)
 Nelly – "Hot in Herre" (3:49)
 Sophie Ellis-Bextor – "Murder on the Dancefloor" (3:47)
 DJ Ötzi – "Hey Baby" (3:37)
 John Mayer – "No Such Thing" (3:52)
 Chad Kroeger featuring Josey Scott – "Hero" (3:19)
 Selwyn – "Way Love's Supposed to Be" (3:50)
 Ja Rule featuring Case – "Livin' It Up" (4:18)
 Alicia Keys – "Girlfriend" (3:35)
 A1 – "Caught in the Middle" (3:25)
 The Calling – "Wherever You Will Go" (3:29)
 DJ Sammy and Yanou featuring Do – "Heaven" (S'n'Y Mix) (3:54)
 Kosheen – "Hide U" (4:12)
 Pink – "Get the Party Started" (3:12)
 Tim Deluxe – "It Just Won't Do" (3:20)
 Five for Fighting – "Superman (It's Not Easy)" (3:44)

Charts

References

So Fresh albums
2002 compilation albums
2003 in Australian music